The Vejle–Holstebro railway line is a  long standard-gauge single-track railway line in Denmark which runs through the central Jutland region between Vejle and Holstebro.

The section from Vejle to Give opened in 1894, the section from Give to Herning in 1914 and the section from Skive to Struer in 1904.

The line is owned and maintained by Rail Net Denmark and served with intercity trains by the Danish State Railways (DSB) and regional trains by Arriva.

History 

The section from Vejle to Give opened on 2 August 1894 as the private railway Vejle–Give. In connection with the construction of the railway line between Give and Herning, the state took over ownership of VGJ on 1 April 1912. On 1 October 1914, the Danish State Railways (DSB) took over the operation of the line, which has since been operated as part of the Vejle–Holstebro railway line. The section from Give to Herning opened in 1914 and the section from Skive to Struer in 1904.

In 2018, operation of the regional rail services on the Vejle–Holstebro line were transferred from DSB to the public transport company Arriva.

Operations

Regional trains 
The railway company Arriva runs frequent regional train services from Vejle station to Struer station.

InterCity service 
The Danish State Railways (DSB) operates four daily InterCity connections between Copenhagen and Struer.

Stations 
  (Vj) 
  (Vjs)
  (Jl)
  (Gw)
  (Ty) 
  (Bb)
  (Hr)
  
  (Id)
  (Uu)
  (Ho)

See also
 List of railway lines in Denmark

References

Notes

Bibliography

External links 

 Banedanmark – government agency responsible for maintenance and traffic control of most of the Danish railway network
 DSB – largest Danish train operating company
 Arriva – British multinational public transport company operating bus and train services in Denmark
 Danske Jernbaner – website with information on railway history in Denmark

Railway lines in Denmark
Railway lines opened in 1894
Railway lines opened in 1904
Railway lines opened in 1914
Rail transport in the Central Denmark Region
Rail transport in the Region of Southern Denmark